Charles de Lorraine (22 February 1684 – 29 December 1751) was a member of the House of Guise, a cadet branch of the House of Lorraine. Succeeding his father as the Count of Armagnac, he also succeeded as Count of Brionne as well as the Grand Squire of France.

Biography
Born to Louis de Lorraine, Count d'Armagnac, and his wife Catherine de Neufville, he was the couple's last child.

His father Louis, was the Grand Squire of France, one of the Great Officers of the Crown of France and a member of the King's Household. The position was roughly equivalent to the United Kingdom positions of Master of the Horse and the Crown Equerry. This entitled his father to be addressed as Monsieur le Grand, a style which Charles would later use, after succeeding his father in his posts (at Charles' death, it was given to Louis' grandson, the Prince de Lambesc).

Charles' mother was Catherine de Neufville, youngest child of Nicolas de Neufville, Maréchal de Villeroy, governor of the young Louis XIV. Charles' uncle was the next Duke of Villeroy and the future governor of Louis XV.

His sister, Marie was the mother of Louise Hippolyte Grimaldi, the only Princess of Monaco to reign in her own right. His older brother Henri, Count of Brionne was expected to succeed to the Armagnac titles but died in 1713, five years before his father.

On 22 May 1717 during the Regency of Philippe d'Orléans (1715–1723) Charles married Françoise Adélaide de Noailles, the eldest daughter of Adrien Maurice de Noailles, Duke de Noailles and his wife Françoise Charlotte d'Aubigné, the niece and heiress of Madame de Maintenon. The couple had no issue, and divorced in 1721. He died in Paris aged 67.

With his death in 1745, the County of Armagnac reverted to the French king, who had only first given it away to the Guise-Lorrain family in 1645.

Ancestry

Notes

1684 births
1751 deaths
House of Lorraine
18th-century French people
House of Guise
17th-century French people
Grand Squires of France
Counts of Armagnac
Princes of Lorraine